High Rock is a mountain summit located in the Cascade Range, in the U.S. state of Washington.

References

Mountains of Washington (state)
Mountains of Lewis County, Washington
North American 1000 m summits